Adela Elizabeth Zúñiga Morazán (born 4 February 1942) is a Honduran politician. She served as deputy of the National Congress of Honduras representing the National Party of Honduras for the Cortés Department during the 2006–2010 term.

References

1942 births
Living people
Deputies of the National Congress of Honduras
National Party of Honduras politicians
21st-century Honduran women politicians
21st-century Honduran politicians